Mark Douglas Norman is a marine biologist living in southern Australia, where he works through the University of Melbourne and Museum Victoria.  For over a decade, Norman has been working exclusively with cephalopods and he is one of the leading scientists in the field, having discovered over 150 new species of octopuses. The best known of these is probably the mimic octopus.

Mark Norman is the author of Cephalopods: A World Guide, a book published in 2000 containing over 800 colour photographs of cephalopods in their natural habitat.

References

Australian marine biologists
Teuthologists
Living people
Year of birth missing (living people)